Sir Charles Scarborough or Scarburgh MP FRS FRCP (29 December 1615 – 26 February 1694) was an English physician and mathematician.

Upbringing
Scarborough was born in St. Martin's-in-the-Fields, Westminster, in 1615, to Edmund Scarburgh and his wife Hannah (Colonel Edmund Scarburgh, prominent Virginia colonist, was his brother), and was educated at St Paul's School, Gonville and Caius College, Cambridge (BA, 1637, MA, 1640) and Merton College, Oxford (MD, 1646). While at Oxford he was a student of William Harvey, and the two would become close friends. Scarborough was also tutor to Christopher Wren, who was  his assistant for a time.

Royal physician
Following the Restoration in 1660, Scarborough was appointed physician to Charles II, who knighted him in 1669; Scarborough attended the king on his deathbed, and was later physician to James II and William and Mary. During the reign of James II, Scarborough served (from 1685 to 1687) as Member of Parliament for Camelford in Cornwall.

Merits
Scarborough was an original fellow of the Royal Society. As a fellow of the Royal College of Physicians, the author of a treatise on anatomy, Syllabus Musculorum, which was used for many years as a textbook, and a translator and commentator on the first six books of Euclid's Elements, published in 1705. He also appeared as the subject of a poem by Abraham Cowley.

Scarborough died in London on 26 February 1694 and was buried at Cranford, Middlesex. St Dunstan's Church there has a monument to him in Latin and English (as "Scarburgh"), erected by his widow.

References

1615 births
1694 deaths
Medical doctors from London
Mathematicians from London
Alumni of Gonville and Caius College, Cambridge
British anatomists
17th-century English mathematicians
Fellows of the Royal College of Physicians
Members of the pre-1707 English Parliament for constituencies in Cornwall
Original Fellows of the Royal Society
English MPs 1685–1687
17th-century English medical doctors
Alumni of Merton College, Oxford